The Buchmann Galerie is a contemporary art gallery with branches in Lugano in the Swiss canton of Ticino and in Germany.

References

External links
Cragg Foundation
Buchmann Galerie

Contemporary art galleries in Switzerland
Contemporary art galleries in Germany